The Middle River Reservoir is located on the north of Kangaroo Island in South Australia.

Construction of Middle River Reservoir was started in response to a doubling of the population on Kangaroo Island following the Second World War. The reservoir supplies water to Kingscote, Brownlow KI and Parndana.

See also
List of reservoirs and dams in Australia

References

Dams in South Australia
Reservoirs in South Australia
Kangaroo Island